John Arthur Banaszak (born August 24, 1950) is an American football coach and former player.  He was formerly the head football coach at Robert Morris University.  Banaszak played in the National Football League with the Pittsburgh Steelers from 1975 to 1981. He is a three-time Super Bowl Champion. Banaszak was a starter at right defensive end for the Steelers in Super Bowl XIII and Super Bowl XIV. He later played in the United States Football League (USFL), winning a championship as a starting defensive end for the Michigan Panthers in 1983. Banaszak played for Michigan in 1983 and 1984 and for the Memphis Showboats in 1985.

Benaszak served in the United States Marine Corps on active duty from 1969 to 1971 and in a reserve status from 1971 to 1975. He was inducted into the Marine Corps Sports Hall of Fame in 2017.

After his football career, owned a chain of oil change centers and worked for the Peters Township Recreation Department.  In 1995, Banaszak became defensive coordinator of Washington & Jefferson College football team.  He was promoted to head coach in 1999.  He was fired from W&J after publicly exploring other coaching jobs.  He left the college as the third-most winning coach in school history.

Banaszak was an assistant football coach under Joe Walton at Robert Morris University in Pittsburgh. He officially began his duties as head coach at Robert Morris in December 2013

Banaszak was hospitalized in Pittsburgh on April 23, 2009 in serious condition.  It was first reported that he had suffered multiple aneurysms. That was later found to be incorrect and he may have suffered from an overdose of aspirin which was being taken for neck pain.

Head coaching record

Football

References

External links
 Robert Morris profile

1950 births
Living people
American football defensive ends
American football defensive tackles
Eastern Michigan Eagles football players
Memphis Showboats players
Michigan Panthers players
Pittsburgh Steelers players
Robert Morris Colonials football coaches
Washington & Jefferson Presidents baseball coaches
Washington & Jefferson Presidents football coaches
Players of American football from Cleveland